The 2018 Georgia State Panthers beach volleyball represented Georgia State University during the college beach volleyball season of 2018. The team's head coach was Beth Van Fleet in her fifth season at GSU. The Panthers played their home games at the GSU Beach Volleyball Complex and compete in the Division I Coastal Collegiate Sports Association. The 2017 season was the third as an official NCAA sport, and the second that the Panthers played in the CCSA. The Panthers finished with a 24–12 record, ranked 11th in the official NCAA sanctioned AVCA coaches poll.

2018 Roster

Schedule

|- align="center" bgcolor="#ffccc"
| February 23 || #8 South Carolina || 12 || Deland, FL || L 0-5 || 0-1 (0-1)
|- bgcolor="#ccffcc"
| February 23 || #15 Stetson || 12 || Deland, FL || W 3-2 || 1-1 (0-1)
|- bgcolor="#ccffcc"
| February 24 || Eckerd || 12 || Deland, FL || W 4-1 || 2-1 (0-1)
|- align="center" bgcolor="#ffccc"
| February 24 || #4 Florida State || 12 || Deland, FL || L 1-4 || 2-2 (0-2)
|- bgcolor="#ffffff"
| February 24 || Florida Atlantic || 12 || Deland, FL || Cancelled || -
|- bgcolor="#ccffcc"
| March 3 || #6 LSU || 13 || St. Augustine, FL || W 3-2 || 3-2 (1-2)
|- bgcolor="#ccffcc"
| March 3 || Texas A&M-Corpus Christi || 13 || St. Augustine, FL || W 5-0 || 4-2 (1-2)
|- bgcolor="#ccffcc"
| March 4 || UNC Wilmington || 13 || St. Augustine, FL || W 4-1 || 5-2 (2-2)
|- align="center" bgcolor="#ffccc"
| March 4 || #9 South Carolina || 13 || St. Augustine, FL || L 3-2 || 5-3 (2-3)
|- bgcolor="#ccffcc"
| March 6 || Austin Peay || 13 || GSU Beach Volleyball Complex || W 5-0 || 6-3 (2-3)
|- bgcolor="#ccffcc"
| March 6 || Jacksonville State || 13 || GSU Beach Volleyball Complex || W 5-0 || 7-3 (2-3)
|- bgcolor="#ccffcc"
| March 10 ||  Florida Gulf Coast || 11 || Boca Raton || W 5-0 || 8-3 (2-3)
|- bgcolor="#ccffcc"
| March 10 || Houston Baptist || 11 || Boca Raton || W 3-2 || 9-3 (2-3)
|- bgcolor="#ccffcc"
| March 10 || #15 Florida Atlantic || 11 || Boca Raton || W 4-1 || 10-3 (3-3)
|- bgcolor="#ccffcc"
| March 17 || #7 LSU || 11 || Columbia, SC || W 3-2 || 11-3 (4-3)
|- align="center" bgcolor="#ffccc"
| March 17 || #9 South Carolina || 11 || Columbia, SC || L 1-4 || 11-4 (4-4)
|- align="center" bgcolor="#ffccc"
| March 18 || #1 Pepperdine || 11 || Columbia, SC || L 1-4 || 11-5 (4-4)
|- bgcolor="#ccffcc"
| March 18 || Jacksonville State || 11 || Columbia, SC || W 5-0 || 12-5 (4-4)
|- bgcolor="#ccffcc"
| March 23 || Jacksonville State || 9 || GSU Beach Volleyball Complex || W 5-0 || 13-5 (4-4)
|- bgcolor="#ccffcc"
| March 23 || North Florida || 9 || GSU Beach Volleyball Complex || W 5-0 || 14-5 (4-4)
|- bgcolor="#ccffcc"
| March 24 || ULM || 9 || GSU Beach Volleyball Complex || W 3-2 || 15-5 (4-4)
|- bgcolor="#ccffcc"
| March 24 || Mercer || 9 || GSU Beach Volleyball Complex || W 5-0 || 16-5 (4-4)
|- bgcolor="#ccffcc"
| March 30 || Tulane Green Wave || 9 || South Beach, FL || W 4-1 || 17-5 (5-4)
|- bgcolor="#ccffcc"
| March 30 || TCU || 9 || South Beach, FL || W 3-2 || 18-5 (5-4)
|- align="center" bgcolor="#ffccc"
| March 31 || #11 Grand Canyon || 9 || South Beach, FL || L 2-3 || 18-6 (5-4)
|- align="center" bgcolor="#ffccc"
| March 31 || #12 FIU || 9 || South Beach, FL || L 2-3 || 18-7 (5-5)
|- align="center" bgcolor="#ffccc"
| April 6 || TCU || 11 || Tallahassee, FL || L 1-4 || 18-8 (5-5)
|- bgcolor="#ccffcc"
| April 6 || UAB || 11 || Tallahassee, FL || W 3-2 || 19-8 (6-5)
|- bgcolor="#ccffcc"
| April 7 || UNC Wilmington || 11 || Tallahassee, FL || W 5-0 || 20-8 (7-5)
|- bgcolor="#ffffff"
| April 7 || Florida State || 11 || Tallahassee, FL || Cancelled || -
|- align="center" bgcolor="#ffccc"
| April 14 || #7 Florida State || 11 || Baton Rouge, LA || L 0-5 || 20-9 (7-6)
|- align="center" bgcolor="#ffccc"
| April 14 || #8 LSU || 11 || Baton Rouge, LA || L 1-4 || 20-10 (7-7)
|- bgcolor="#ccffcc"
| April 15 || New Orleans || 11 || Baton Rouge, LA || W 5-0 || 21-10 (7-7)
|- bgcolor="#ccffcc"
| April 15 || TCU || 11 || Baton Rouge, LA || W 3-2 || 22-10 (7-7)
|- align="center" bgcolor="#ffccc"
| April 20 || LSU || 11 || Emerson, GA || L 2-3 || 22-11 (7-8)
|- bgcolor="#ccffcc"
| April 20 || Florida State || 11 || Emerson, GA || W 4-1 || 23-11 (8-8)
|- align="center" bgcolor="#ffccc"
| April 21 || Florida Atlantic || 11 || Emerson, GA || L 0-5 || 23-12 (8-9)
|- bgcolor="#ccffcc"
| April 21 || UNC-Wilmington || 11 || Emerson, GA || W 5-0 || 24-12 (9-9)
|-

 Conference Games in bold

References

External links
 Georgia State University Official website
 Georgia State Panthers Official Athletics website

2018
Georgia State Panthers women's beach volleyball